Laurence Docherty (born 24 February 1980 in Edinburgh) is a Dutch field hockey player of Scottish origin.

He came to the Netherlands in 2000, and played club hockey for HC Klein Zwitserland until the 2007–8 season, when he moved to rival club Bloemendaal.

In 2007, Docherty missed out on playing the European Championship in Manchester, but was called into the Netherlands squad for the Champions Trophy in Malaysia in November 2007, thus boosting his prospects of playing in the Beijing Olympics, which he did.

His last trip saw him grace the indoor court of Dublin college university where he played with Clontarf, playing with such stars as the Forrest brothers, Kev King and Rob Abbott. Laurence, helped them to progress to the final 8 of the tournament. Docherty was then ruled out of the finals day with a knee injury he received in South Africa while training for the World cup in India. The Scotsman was deeply disappointed he could not travel back to Ireland and also that he could not take part in the World Cup either.

References
 WorldHockey

External links
 

1980 births
Living people
Dutch male field hockey players
Dutch people of Scottish descent
Naturalised citizens of the Netherlands
Sportspeople from Edinburgh
Scottish male field hockey players
Olympic field hockey players of the Netherlands
Field hockey players at the 2008 Summer Olympics
HC Klein Zwitserland players
HC Bloemendaal players